Aud Korbøl (born 1 October 1940) is a Norwegian sociologist and novelist. She made her literary debut in 1989 with Pell'ongen og je. Among her novels are Leiegårdsvalsen from 1992, Noe gikk forbi from 1996, and Det er from 2002.

She was awarded Mads Wiel Nygaards Endowment in 1996.

References

1940 births
Living people
20th-century Norwegian novelists
21st-century Norwegian novelists
Norwegian women novelists
21st-century Norwegian women writers
20th-century Norwegian women writers